Izatha mira is a moth of the family Oecophoridae. It is endemic to New Zealand, where it is known from the western South Island, except north-west Nelson.

The wingspan is 16–21 mm for males and 17–23 mm for females. Adults have been recorded in November, December and January.

References

Oecophorinae